Two lunar eclipses occurred in 1963: 

 6 July 1963 partial lunar eclipse
 30 December 1963 total lunar eclipse

See also 
 List of 20th-century lunar eclipses
 Lists of lunar eclipses